The Burkina Faso national under-16 basketball team is a national basketball team of Burkina Faso, governed by the Fédération Burkinabe de Basketball.
It represents the country in international under-16 (under age 16) basketball competitions.

Its last appearance was at the 2009 FIBA Africa Under-16 Championship qualification stage.

See also
Burkina Faso men's national basketball team
Burkina Faso men's national under-18 basketball team
Burkina Faso women's national basketball team
Burkina Faso women's national under-18 basketball team

References

External links
Archived records of Burkina Faso team participations

Basketball teams in Burkina Faso
Men's national under-16 basketball teams
Basketball